Microlera is a genus of beetles in the family Cerambycidae, containing the following species:

 Microlera kanoi Hayashi, 1971
 Microlera ptinoides Bates, 1873
 Microlera yayeyamensis Hayashi, 1968

References

Apomecynini